Colin Murphy (born April 11, 1980 in Fort McMurray, Alberta) is a left winger currently an Unrestricted Free Agent. He most recently played in the Deutsche Eishockey Liga for the Hamburg Freezers.

Playing career

Growing up on Alderwood in Abasand in the 1990s, the Family Garage door was dented from numerous puck strikes during the winter from his Two Brothers and himself, relentless in the Pursuit of Greatness. Summers were spent playing ball hockey from garage to garage down the narrow street from 108 Alderwood. He owned the 'net'.
 
Undrafted, Murphy played collegiate hockey with Michigan Tech of the Western Collegiate Hockey Association. Scoring at a point per game pace with 152 points in 145 games, Murphy was signed as a free agent by the Toronto Maple Leafs on September 14, 2005.

Murphy made his professional debut upon completion of his college career, playing the Leafs affiliate the St. John's Maple Leafs at the end of the 2004–05 season. Colin started his first full pro season in 2005–06 and became the first player to score for new leafs affiliate, the Toronto Marlies.

On August 4, 2008, Murphy was signed by the Buffalo Sabres as an unrestricted free agent. He was then assigned to affiliate, the Portland Pirates for the 2008–09 season.

On May 11, 2009, Murphy signed a one-year contract with German team, Augsburger Panther. Colin finished second on the Panthers in scoring with 57 points for the 2009–10 season before signing with fellow DEL team the Hamburg Freezers on June 28, 2010.

Awards and honours

Career statistics

References

External links

1980 births
Augsburger Panther players
Hamburg Freezers players
Ice hockey people from Alberta
Living people
Michigan Tech Huskies men's ice hockey players
People from Fort McMurray
Portland Pirates players
St. John's Maple Leafs players
Toronto Marlies players
Canadian ice hockey left wingers
AHCA Division I men's ice hockey All-Americans